Sungai Durian, or "Durian River", is a district of Kotabaru Regency in the province of South Kalimantan, Indonesia.
The population is entirely rural.

Geography

The district capital is Manunggal Lama. 
Sungai Durian is bordered on the north by the districts of North Pamukan and Pamukan West; on the east by the district of Sampanahan; on the south by the district of Kelumpang West; and on the west by the district of Juai, Hulu Sungai Utara.
It contains seven villages:

Sungai Durian is in the Kutai Basin, which holds a major coal formation created from the Early Pliocene to the Eocene.

Demographics

The district had a total population of 10,400 as of the 2010 census, all considered rural. Of these 5,610 were male and 4,790 female.
The breakdown by religion was Islam: 7,029, Christian: 1,130, Catholic: 283, Hindu: 117, Buddhist: 1,104, Other: 737.

Notes

Sources

Populated places in South Kalimantan